Phrodita is a genus of moths of the family Erebidae. The genus was described by Schaus in 1898. Both species are found in the Brazilian state of Paraná.

Species
Phrodita bilinea Schaus, 1898
Phrodita fasciata Jones, 1908

References

Calpinae